is a passenger railway station in the city of Sodegaura, Chiba Prefecture, Japan, operated by the East Japan Railway Company (JR East).

Lines
Yokota Station is served by the Kururi Line, and is located 9.3 km from the western terminus of the line at Kisarazu Station.

Station layout
The station consists of two opposed side platforms connected by a level crossing. The station is one of the few on the Kururi Line which is fully staffed, and which allows for trains coming from opposite directions to pass one another.

Platforms

History
It was renamed Yokota Station on July 1, 1915. The line was nationalized into the Japanese Government Railways (JGR) on September 1, 1923. The JGR became the Japanese National Railways (JNR) after World War II. The station was absorbed into the JR East network upon the privatization of JNR on April 1, 1987.

Passenger statistics
In fiscal 2019, the station was used by an average of 165 passengers daily (boarding passengers only).

Surrounding area

See also
 List of railway stations in Japan

References

External links

 Yokota Station information (JR East) 

Railway stations in Japan opened in 1912
Railway stations in Chiba Prefecture
Kururi Line
Sodegaura